Steven Hawes may refer to:
Stephen Hawes (died 1523), English poet
Steve Hawes (born 1950), former American basketball player

See also
 Steven Hawe (born 1980), Northern Irish footballer